Arundhuti Maitra (born 17 November 1990), better known as Lovely Maitra, is a Bengali television actress and a politician. She started her career as the lead actress in the hugely popular 2013 Bengali television serial Jol Nupur, on Star Jalsha. She has also acted in other Bengali TV series like Mohar and Guddi.

In 2021 West Bengal Legislative Assembly election, she was elected to the West Bengal Legislative Assembly from Sonarpur Dakshin as a member of the All India Trinamool Congress.

References

External links 
 

Living people
West Bengal MLAs 2021–2026
Trinamool Congress politicians from West Bengal
21st-century Indian politicians
21st-century Indian women politicians
1990 births